Lewis Hastings Sarett (December 22, 1917 – November 29, 1999) was an American organic chemist. While serving as a research scientist at Merck & Co., Inc., synthesized cortisone.

Biography
He was born in Champaign, Illinois. His father was Lew Sarett, a renowned Jewish poet and professor and an uncle of former Secretary of Defense Donald Rumsfeld. He lived in Laona, Wisconsin for a time and then attended high school in Highland Park, Illinois . He received a Bachelor of Science from Northwestern University in 1939 (Phi Beta Kappa) and his doctorate from Princeton University.

He worked for Merck & Co. for 38 years retiring in 1982. He invented a Process of Treating Pregnene Compounds Cortisone, Patent Number 2,462,133.

Named after him is the Sarett Oxidation which is the oxidation of an alcohol to a ketone or an aldehyde using chromic oxide and pyridine. Primary alcohols will be oxidised to aldehydes and not carboxylic acids.

Writing career

He is also famous for writing the poem The Four Little Foxes to raise awareness about animal rights.

Honors and awards
1964 Scheele Award
1972 Chemical Pioneer Award from the American Institute of Chemists
1975 National Medal of Science
1976 Perkin Medal
1980 Inducted into the National Inventors Hall of Fame
1980 Awarded the IRI Medal from the Industrial Research Institute for his contributions to technology leadership
1981 American Institute of Chemists Gold Medal

References

External links
Arthur A. Patchett, "Lewis Hastings Sarett", Biographical Memoirs of the National Academy of Sciences (2002)
Inventors hall of fame
http://www.todayinsci.com/12/12_22.htm
New York Times Obituary, December 27, 1999.

20th-century American chemists
Jewish chemists
Jewish American scientists
National Medal of Science laureates
Scientists from Illinois
Princeton University alumni
Northwestern University alumni
People from Champaign, Illinois
20th-century American inventors
1917 births
1999 deaths
20th-century American Jews
Members of the National Academy of Medicine